The 2013 Coupe de France Final was the 95th final of France's most prestigious football cup competition. The final took place on 31 May 2013 at the Stade de France in Saint-Denis and was contested between Bordeaux and Evian. The winner of the Coupe de France was guaranteed a place in the group stage of the UEFA Europa League with the club's appearance being dependent on whether it qualifies for the 2013–14 UEFA Champions League. The final was broadcast live on France 2.

Evian TG reached the final for the first time in their history. Bordeaux won their fourth Coupe de France, and first since 1987, after a 3–2 victory against Évian.

Match

Summary
Bordeaux opened the scoring in the 39th minute when Cheick Diabaté went around Evian goalkeeper Bertrand Laquait to slot home. Bordeaux were awarded a penalty a minute into the second half when Diabaté was brought down, but Laquait saved the spot kick with a one-handed stop down to his left from Diabaté. Evian equalised in the 51st minute when Yannick Sagbo controlled the ball on his chest before finishing from close range. Bordeaux went ahead again two minutes later when Henri Saivet scored from five yards out. In the 70th minute the scores were level again when Brice Dja Djedje finished at the back post after a cross from the left. With one minute remaining, Diabaté got the winning goal when he scored from seven yards out, after being played in by Nicolas Maurice-Belay.

See also 
 2012–13 Coupe de France

References

External links 
 Official site

2013
Coupe De France Final 2013
Coupe De France Final 2013
Coupe De France Final
Coupe De France Final
Coupe De France Final 2013
Coupe De France Final